El Ronquillo is a town in the province of Seville, Spain. According to the 2005 census (Instituto Nacional de Estadística), the city has a population of 1381 inhabitants.

References

External links
El Ronquillo - Sistema de Información Multiterritorial de Andalucía

Municipalities of the Province of Seville